Century Broadcasting Network is a Philippine radio network. Its corporate office is located at S-510, Comfoods Bldg., Gil Puyat Ave. cor. Chino Roces Ave., Makati. CBN operates a number of stations across places in the country under the Magik FM branding.

Profile
Century Communications Marketing Center, Inc. was established in 1984 as a broadcast management consultancy firm composed of industry professionals. In 1992, it expanded into FM broadcasting in key provinces under the name Century Broadcasting Network, in which these stations bear the Magik FM brand. Previously, it used to have stations in other cities affiliated with The Edge Radio. They were later on spun-off into its current owner Christian Music Power.

CBN stations

Notes

Former stations

References

Radio stations in the Philippines
Philippine radio networks